Alexey Andryunin (born June 18, 1976) is a Russian bobsledder who has competed since 1998. His only Bobsleigh World Cup victory was in the four-man event at Lake Placid in December 2007.

Andryunin's best finish at the FIBT World Championships was eighth in the two-man event at Altenberg in 2008.

References
FIBT profile

1976 births
Living people
Russian male bobsledders
Olympic bobsledders of Russia
Bobsledders at the 2002 Winter Olympics